Muffin top (or muffin-top) may refer to:

Muffin top, skin or body fat that is visible above the waistline 
Muffin top, the upper crisp portion of a baked quickbread